Bill Lobenstein (born William Joseph Lobenstein on May 11, 1961) was a player in the National Football League for the Denver Broncos in 1987 as a defensive end.

Biography
Lobenstein was born in Mauston, Wisconsin.  He played at the University of Wisconsin–Madison, College of DuPage  and the University of Wisconsin–Whitewater. His high school career took place in Deerfield at Deerfield High School.

References

American football defensive ends
Denver Broncos players
Living people
Wisconsin Badgers football players
Wisconsin–Whitewater Warhawks football players
People from Mauston, Wisconsin
Players of American football from Wisconsin
1961 births